Lac-Saint-Joseph is a town in Quebec, Canada, located on the namesake Saint-Joseph Lake.

Demographics 

Mother tongue:
 English as first language: 0%
 French as first language: 98.4%
 English and French as first language: 0%
 Other as first language: 0%

List of mayors
 J. Gérald Coote, 1936
 J. A. Saucier, 1936-1952
 Henri Giguère, 1952-1961
 Guy Desrivières, lawyer, 1961-1967
 Fernand Grenier, Professor University Laval 1967-1974
 J.-Arthur Bédard, 1974-1982
 Raymond Blouin, 1982-1990 and 1994-2005
 Robert Simard, 1990-1994
 O'Donnell Bédard, 2005-

Political representation 

Provincially it is part of the riding of La Peltrie. In the 2022 Quebec general election the incumbent MNA Éric Caire, of the Coalition Avenir Québec, was re-elected to represent the population of Lac-Saint-Joseph in the National Assembly of Quebec.

Federally, Lac-Saint-Joseph is part of the federal riding of Portneuf—Jacques-Cartier. In the 2021 Canadian federal election, the incumbent Joël Godin of the Conservative Party was re-elected to represent the population Lac-Saint-Joseph in the House of Commons of Canada.

See also
List of cities in Quebec

References

External links

Incorporated places in Capitale-Nationale
Cities and towns in Quebec